Alexandru Sterca-Șuluțiu, also called Alexandru Sterca-Șuluțiu de Cărpiniș (February 15, 1794 – September 7, 1867), was an ethnic Romanian Eastern Catholic cleric in Imperial Austrian Transylvania, and the Metropolitan of the Transylvanian Greek Catholic Church. He was the brother of 1848 revolutionary commander Ioan Sterca-Șuluțiu.

During his service the Diocese of Alba Iulia and Făgăraş (centred at Blaj) was removed from the jurisdiction of the Roman Catholic Archdiocese of Esztergom (in Hungary) and became an ecclesiastic province in its own right, with the Dioceses of Oradea Mare, Gherla and Lugoj as suffragans (subordinate dioceses).

Origins and studies
Born in Abrud, Șuluțiu came from a noble Romanian family of Transylvania. The roots of the family seem to be very old, as the Italian spelling of this family name is Sollozzo. He studied at Abrud, Alba Iulia and Blaj, where he prepared for the priesthood in the diocesan seminary. On November 8, 1814, he married Ana Aron of Bistra, and on December 6 of the same year he was made a priest. His wife died on February 18, 1818, leaving him a widower.

Ecclesiastical career
In 1836 he became the archpriest of Şimleu. In the electoral synod on September 30, 1850, he ended up first of the candidates running to fill the episcopal seat of Făgăraș and Alba Iulia. On November 18, 1850, he was named to the post, while on July 22, 1851, he was consecrated bishop in Saint Nicholas Cathedral, Oradea.

On December 6, 1853, Pope Pius IX removed the diocese of Făgăraș from the metropolitan jurisdiction and primacy of the archbishop of Esztergom, and raised it to the dignity of archdiocese and metropolitanate. Through this act, Bishop Șuluțiu became both Archbishop and Metropolitan. On October 28, 1855, he was installed in his new post in a great ceremony held at Blaj in the presence of the Apostolic Nuncio from Vienna, Cardinal Michele Viale-Prelà (later Roman Catholic Archbishop of Bologna).

Bibliography
Nicolae Edroiu, "O lucrare istorică inedită a lui Alexandru Sterca-Șuluțiu" ("A Previously Unpublished Historical Work of Alexandru Sterca-Șuluțiu"), in Anuarul Institutului de Istorie și Arheologie din Cluj, XXV, 1982, pp. 287–294
Corina Teodor, "Un spirit polemic: Alexandru Sterca-Șuluțiu" ("A Polemical Spirit: Alexandru Sterca-Șuluțiu"), in Anuarul Institutului de Cercetări Socio-Umane "Gheorghe Șincai" al Academiei Române, Târgu-Mureş, 1999
Nicolae Edroiu, Aurel Răduțiu, Pompiliu Teodor (ed.), "Preocupările istorice ale lui Alexandru Sterca-Șuluțiu (1794-1867)" ("The Historic Concerns of Alexandru Sterca-Șuluțiu (1794-1867)"), in Stat, societate, națiune. Interpretări istorice ("State, Society, Nation. Historic Interpretations"), Cluj-Napoca, Editura Dacia, 1982.

External links
  Nicolae Edroiu, The Historiographic Works of the First Metropolitan of Blaj, Alexandru Sterca-Şuluţiu

1794 births
1867 deaths
Austrian nobility
Primates of the Romanian Greek Catholic Church
Romanian people in the Principality of Transylvania (1711–1867)
People from Abrud
Romanian Austro-Hungarians
Romanian nobility
19th-century Eastern Catholic archbishops
19th-century Romanian people
Eastern Catholic bishops in Romania